Herbert García King (16 December 1963 – 2 August 2018), known artistically as Herbert King, was a Colombian actor.

Biography 
King was born in the city of Santa Marta and in his youth moved to England, where he had his training in dramatic art. Back in his native country he moved to the city of Bogotá where he began his career as an actor. After a minor appearance in the series The alternative of the scorpion, he joined the cast of Guajira, popular telenovela of 1996 by RCN Televisión. Two years later he played the role of Bernabé in the short film by Sergio Cabrera, Golpe de Estadio. A year later he joined the cast of the series Francisco the mathematician in the role of Octavio Tobón.

He started the 2000s with a participation in the telenovela Alejo, the search for love, followed by appearances in soap operas Pedro el escamoso, Pasión de Gavilanes, La saga, negocio de familia, La Tormenta, En los tacones de Eva, Nuevo rico, nuevo pobre. Also in the same decade he joined the cast of films like Perder es cuestión de método, Mi abuelo, mi padre y yo and La immoral ministra.

In the decade of 2010 its participation in the Colombian television continued being active, registering appearances in series and telenovelas like El capo, Sin tetas no hay paraíso, Bella calamidades, ¿Dónde carajos está Umaña?, Tres Caínes, and Diomedes, el cacique de la junta. In 2017 he acted in the Spanish film Loving Pablo, directed by Fernando León de Aranoa. He died on 2 August 2018, of a heart attack in the Clinic La Colina in Bogota.

Filmography 
 1992 – La alternativa del escorpión
 1996 – Guajira
 1998 – Golpe de estadio
 1999 – Francisco el matemático 
 2000 – 
 2001 – Pedro el escamoso
 2003 – Pasión de gavilanes
 2004 – Perder es cuestión de método
 2004 – La saga, negocio de familia
 2005 – La Tormenta
 2005 – 
 2005 – Juego limpio
 2006 – En los tacones de Eva
 2007 – Nuevo rico, nuevo pobre
 2007 – 
 2008 – Sin senos no hay paraíso
 2008 – Doña Bárbara
 2009 – El capo
 2010 – Sin tetas no hay paraíso
 2010 – Ojo por ojo
 2010 – Bella Calamidades
 2012 – Lynch
 2012 –  
 2013 – Tres Caínes
 2015 – Diomedes, el cacique de la junta
 2017 – Loving Pablo

References

External links 
 

1963 births
2018 deaths
People from Santa Marta
Colombian film actors
Colombian male telenovela actors
Colombian male television actors
20th-century Colombian male actors
21st-century Colombian male actors
Colombian people of English descent